Adrastus pallens is a species of click beetles native to Europe.

References

Elateridae
Beetles described in 1792
Beetles of Europe